Baladiyah al-Namar, officially the Al-Namar Sub-Municipality and formerly the Utayqah Municipality, is a baladiyah and one of the 14 sub-municipalities of Riyadh, Saudi Arabia. It consists of 6 neighborhoods and is responsible for their development, planning and maintenance.

Neighborhoods and districts 

 Al-Namar
 Hajrah Laban (partially)
 Zahrah Namar
 Dirab 
 Urayja al-Gharbi
 Al-Hazm

References

Namar